Battle of Bellavista was the final confrontation of the Chilean 1826 campaign to dislodge the Royalists from Chiloé Archipelago. On January 13 Chilean forces were able to capture three small gun boats from the Royalists in Ancud in the Battle of Pudeto. The battle began in the morning of January 14 with a Chilean advance on Ancud. In face of this and the fire of naval and land-based artillery royalist troops retreated to the Fort of San Carlos. As the Chileans began to surround the Spanish positions Quintanilla ordered a retreat to the heights of Bellavista where he hoped to put up some resistance. However, the demoralised royalist troops were not in mood to fight so by late evening Quintanilla ordered a retreat south along the road to Castro. Agüi Fort in Lacuy Peninsula surrendered on January 15. Quintanilla capitulated on January 18 after negotiating the conditions.

References

Bibliography

Bellavista
Bellavista
Bellavista
Bellavista
Bellavista
1826 in Chile
History of Chiloé
January 1826 events
Bellavista
Bellavista